The 1970–71 season was Manchester City's 69th season of competitive football and 51st season in the top division of English football. In addition to the First Division, the club competed in the FA Cup, Football League Cup, UEFA Cup Winners' Cup and the Anglo-Italian League Cup.

First Division

League table

Results summary

References

External links

Manchester City F.C. seasons
Manchester City